Graciela Lara is a Mexican actress of film and television who made her debut in the 1959 film, Santa Claus.

Filmography
The Life of Agustín Lara (1959)
Santa Claus (1959)
La Valentina (1966)
Pedro Páramo (1967)
The Bricklayer (1975)
No Temas al Amor (1980, television series)

External links

Living people
Mexican film actresses
Mexican television actresses
Mexican telenovela actresses
Year of birth missing (living people)